Wafaa Sleiman (born 20 June 1952) is the former First Lady of Lebanon from 2008 to 2014 and the wife of President Michel Suleiman.

Personal details 
Wafaa Sleiman was born in Amsheet, Lebanon, on 20 June 1952. She obtained a bachelor of science degree in Teaching and Education from the Teachers Training College in 1970, then later obtained a bachelor of arts degree in philosophy from the Lebanese University in 1973. She married Michel Suleiman in the same year. They have three children: Rita (born in 1975), Lara (born in 1978) and Charbel (born in 1983).

Honours
 Spain:
 Dame Grand Cross with Collar of the Order of Isabella the Catholic

References

External links

1952 births
First ladies of Lebanon
Lebanese Maronites
Lebanese socialites
Lebanese University alumni
People from Amsheet
Living people